Curve Lake 35A is a First Nations reserve on Fox Island, as well as other adjacent islands including Boyd Island, Joe Island, Red Rock Island and Rottenstone Island, in Buckhorn Lake, Ontario, Canada. It is one of three reserves of the Curve Lake First Nation.

References

External links
 Canada Lands Survey System

Mississauga reserves in Ontario
Communities in Peterborough County